Franz Viktor Werfel (10 September 1890 – 26 August 1945) was an Austrian-Bohemian novelist, playwright, and poet whose career spanned World War I, the Interwar period, and World War II. He is primarily known as the author of The Forty Days of Musa Dagh (1933, English tr. 1934, 2012), a novel based on events that took place during the Armenian genocide of 1915, and The Song of Bernadette (1941), a novel about the life and visions of the French Catholic saint Bernadette Soubirous, which was made into a Hollywood film of the same name.

Early life 
Born in Prague (then part of the Austro-Hungarian Empire), Werfel was the first of three children of a wealthy manufacturer of gloves and leather goods, Rudolf Werfel. His mother, Albine Kussi, was the daughter of a mill owner. His two sisters were Hanna (born 1896) and Marianne Amalie (born 1899). His family was Jewish. As a child, Werfel was raised by his Czech Catholic governess, Barbara Šimůnková, who often took him to mass in Prague's main cathedral. Like the children of other progressive German-speaking Jews in Prague, Werfel was educated at a Catholic school run by the Piarists, a teaching order that allowed for a rabbi to instruct Jewish students for their Bar Mitzvahs. This, along with his governess's influence, gave Werfel an early interest (and expertise) in Catholicism, which soon branched out to other faiths, including Theosophy and Islam, such that his fiction, as well as his nonfiction, provides some insight into comparative religion.

Career 
Werfel began writing at an early age and, by 1911, had published his first book of poems, Der Weltfreund, which can be translated as "the friend to the world" as well as philanthropist, humanitarian, and the like. By this time, Werfel had befriended other German Jewish writers who frequented Prague's , chief among them Max Brod and Franz Kafka, and his poetry was praised by such critics as Karl Kraus, who published Werfel's early poems in Kraus's journal, Die Fackel (The Torch). In 1912, Werfel moved to Leipzig, where he became an editor for Kurt Wolff's new publishing firm, where Werfel championed and edited Georg Trakl's first book of poetry. While he lived in Germany, Werfel's milieu grew to include Else Lasker-Schüler, Martin Buber, Rainer Maria Rilke, among other German-language writers, poets, and intellectuals in the first decades of the twentieth century.

With the outbreak of World War I, Werfel served in the Austro-Hungarian Army on the Russian front as a telephone operator. His duties both exposed him to the vicissitudes of total war as well as provided him with enough of a haven to continue writing Expressionist poems, ambitious plays, and letters voluminously. His eclectic mix of humanism, confessionalism, autobiography, as well as mythology and religiosity developed further during this time. His poems and plays ranged from scenes of ancient Egypt (notably the monotheism of Akhenaton) to occult allusions (Werfel had participated in séances with his friends Brod and Kafka) and incorporate a parable from the Baháʼí Faith in the poem "Jesus and the Carrion Path". His bias for Christian subjects, as well as his antipathy for Zionism, eventually alienated many of his Jewish friends and readers, including early champions such as Karl Kraus. Others, however, stood by him, including Martin Buber, who published a sequence of poems from Werfel's wartime manuscript, Der Gerichtstag (Judgment Day, published in 1919) in his monthly journal, Der Jude (The Jew). and wrote of Werfel in his prefatory remark:

Since I was first moved by his poems, I have opened (knowing well, I should say, it's a problem) the gates of my invisible garden [i.e., an imaginarium] to him, and now he can do nothing for all eternity that would bring me to banish him from it. Compare, if you will, a real person to an anecdotal one, a late book to an earlier, the one you see to you yourself; but I am not putting a value on a poet, only recognizing that he is one—and the way he is one.

In the summer of 1917, Werfel left the frontline for the Military Press Bureau in Vienna, where he joined other notable Austrian writers serving as propagandists, among them Robert Musil, Rilke, Hugo von Hofmannsthal, and Franz Blei. Through the latter, Werfel met and fell in love with Alma Mahler, widow of Gustav Mahler, the former lover of the painter Oskar Kokoschka, and the wife of the architect Walter Gropius, then serving in the Imperial German Army on the Western Front. Alma, who was also a composer, had already set one of Werfel's poems to music, reciprocated despite Werfel being much younger, shorter, and having Jewish features that she, being both anti-Semitic and attracted to Jewish men, initially found distasteful. Their love affair culminated in the premature birth of a son, Martin, in August 1918. Martin, who was given the surname of Gropius, died in May of the following year. Despite attempts to save his marriage to Alma, with whom he had a young daughter, Manon, Gropius reluctantly agreed to a divorce in 1920. Ironically, Alma refused to marry Werfel for the next nine years. However, Alma, more so than with her first two husbands and lovers, lent herself to the development of Werfel's career and influenced it in such a way that he became an accomplished playwright and novelist as well as poet. They married on 6 July 1929.

In April 1924, Verdi – Roman der Oper (Novel of the Opera) was published by Zsolnay Verlag, establishing Werfel's reputation as a novelist. In 1926, Werfel was awarded the Grillparzer Prize by the Austrian Academy of Sciences, and in Berlin, Max Reinhardt performed his play Juarez and Maximilian (depicting  the struggle in 1860's Mexico between the Republican leader Benito Juárez and the French-backed Emperor Maximilian). By the end of the decade, Werfel had become one of the most important and established writers in German and Austrian literature and had already merited one full-length critical biography.

Werfel's journey (with his wife Alma) in 1930, to British-ruled Palestine, and his encounter with the Armenian refugee community in Jerusalem, inspired his novel The Forty Days of Musa Dagh which drew world attention to the Armenian genocide by the Ottoman government. Werfel lectured on this subject across Germany. The Nazi newspaper Das Schwarze Korps denounced him as a propagandist of "alleged Turkish horrors perpetrated against the Armenians". The same newspaper, suggesting a link between the Armenian and the later Jewish genocide, condemned "America's Armenian Jews for promoting in the U.S.A. the sale of Werfel's book".

Werfel was forced to leave the Prussian Academy of Arts in 1933. His books were burned by the Nazis. Werfel left Austria after the Anschluss in 1938 and went to France, where they lived in a fishing village near Marseille. Visitors to their home at this time included Bertolt Brecht and Thomas Mann. After the German invasion and occupation of France during World War II, and the deportation of French Jews to the Nazi concentration camps, Werfel had to flee again. With the assistance of Varian Fry and the Emergency Rescue Committee in Marseille, he and his wife narrowly escaped the Nazi regime, finding shelter for five weeks in the pilgrimage town of Lourdes. He also received much help and kindness from the Catholic orders that staffed the shrine. He vowed to write about the experience and, safe in the United States, he published The Song of Bernadette in 1941.

Fry organized a secret crossing over the Pyrenees on foot. Assisted by Justus Rosenberg, they went to Madrid and then traveled on to Portugal. They stayed in Monte Estoril, at the Grande Hotel D'Itália, between 8 September and 4 October 1940. On the same day they checked out, they boarded the S.S. Nea Hellas headed for New York City, arriving on 13 October.

Werfel and his family settled in Los Angeles, where they met other German and Austrian emigrants, such as Mann, Reinhardt, and Erich Wolfgang Korngold. In southern California, Werfel wrote his final play, Jacobowsky and the Colonel (Jacobowsky und der Oberst) which was made into the 1958 film Me and the Colonel starring Danny Kaye; Giselher Klebe's opera Jacobowsky und der Oberst (1965) is also based on this play. Before his death, he completed the first draft of his last novel Star of the Unborn (Stern der Ungeborenen), which was published posthumously in 1946.

Death 

Franz Werfel died of heart failure in Los Angeles in 1945 and was interred there in the Rosedale Cemetery. However, his body was returned in 1975 to Vienna for reburial in the Zentralfriedhof.

Honours and awards

 1926 Grillparzer Prize
 1927 Czechoslovak State Award
 1930 Schiller Prize
 1937 Austrian Cross of Honour for Science and Art, 1st class
 1949 Naming of Werfelstrasse in Hernals (Vienna)
 1975 Grave of honor in the Zentralfriedhof (Vienna)
 1990 Stamp Austria, Franz Werfel 1890–1945
 1995 Stamp Germany, Franz Werfel, 50th anniversary of Werfel's death
 1995 Stamp Armenia, Franz Werfel and 40 Days of Musa Dagh Hero
 2000 Monument on Schillerplatz in Vienna
 2006 Posthumous Award of Armenian Honorary Citizenship; the plaque was presented to the Austrian National Library.

Bibliography 
In English (some of these titles are out of print):

Mirror-Man: A Magic Trilogy (Spiegelmensch: Magische Trilogie) (1920), play
The Trojans (1922) Play Published by Kurt Wolff as Die Troerinnen. 
Verdi. Novel of the Opera (1924), novel
Juarez and Maximilian (1925), play
Paul Among the Jews: A Tragedy (1926), play
The Man Who Conquered Death (Der Tod des Kleinbürgers) (1928), short story
Class Reunion (Der Abituriententag) (1928), novel (translated into English by Whittaker Chambers)
The Forty Days of Musa Dagh (1933; revised and expanded edition, 2012), novel
Hearken Unto the Voice, or Listen to the Voice, or Jeremiah (Höret die Stimme, or Jeremias) (1937), novel
Embezzled Heaven (Der veruntreute Himmel) (1939), novel
The Song of Bernadette (1941), novel
Pale Blue Ink in a Lady's Hand (Eine blass-blaue Frauenschrift) (1941; 2012), novella
Jacobowsky und der Oberst (1944), play
Star of the Unborn (1945/46), science-fiction novel
Verdi: The Man and His Letters, with Paul Stefan.  New York, Vienna House 1973 
Totentanz: 50 zeitlose Gedichte, editor Martin Werhand.  Melsbach, Martin Werhand Verlag 2016

Filmography 
Juarez, directed by William Dieterle (1939, based on the play Juarez and Maximilian)
The Song of Bernadette, directed by Henry King (1943, based on the novel The Song of Bernadette)
Me and the Colonel, directed by Peter Glenville (1958, based on the play )
, directed by Ernst Marischka (West Germany, 1958, based on the novel Embezzled Heaven)
The Man Who Conquered Death, directed by Hans Hollmann (West Germany/Austria, 1974, TV film, based on the story )
The Forty Days of Musa Dagh, directed by Sarky Mouradian (1982, based on the novel The Forty Days of Musa Dagh)
, directed by Axel Corti (Austria, 1984, TV film, based on the story )
Jacobowsky and the Colonel, directed by Martin Huba (Czechoslovakia, 1987, TV film, based on the play )
Embezzled Heaven, directed by Ottokar Runze (Germany, 1990, TV film, based on the novel Embezzled Heaven)

See also

 Witnesses and testimonies of the Armenian genocide
 Exilliteratur
 Franz Werfel Human Rights Award

References

Further reading

External links 

 
 
 
 
 Mahler-Werfel papers, Kislak Center for Special Collections, Rare Books and Manuscripts, University of Pennsylvania.
 Franz Werfel Papers at UCLA
 Franz Werfel Family Papers at the Leo Baeck Institute, NY
 A small album of miscellaneous photographs
 Franz Werfel author profile
 Jeremiah – Symphony No. 3 (1997) by Bertold Hummel after the novel Jeremias by Franz Werfel

1890 births
1945 deaths
Writers from Prague
Austro-Hungarian military personnel of World War I
Austro-Hungarian writers
Austrian male dramatists and playwrights
German male dramatists and playwrights
20th-century German dramatists and playwrights
Austrian historical novelists
Austrian male short story writers
American male short story writers
American short story writers
American writers in German
20th-century Austrian poets
German male poets
Austro-Hungarian Jews
Jewish novelists
Jewish poets
Jewish American writers
Austrian World War I poets
World War II poets
20th-century German male writers
Exilliteratur writers
Expressionist poets
Jewish emigrants from Austria to the United States after the Anschluss
Recipients of the Austrian Cross of Honour for Science and Art, 1st class
Burials at the Vienna Central Cemetery
German male novelists
20th-century German novelists

Austrian male poets
20th-century short story writers
Austrian science fiction writers
20th-century Austrian dramatists and playwrights
20th-century American male writers
20th-century American Jews